Sri Lanka have participated in all but three Commonwealth Games since 1938, with the only ones missed being the 1954, 1974 and 1986 Games. Sri Lanka have won twenty medals at the Games, but had a 44-year medal drought spanning 1950 to 1994. Until 1974, Sri Lanka competed under the name Ceylon.

List of Games Bids

Overall Medal Tally

List of medalists

Source:

Overall Medal Tally by Sport

Numbers of athletes and sports
This list shows the total number of athletes, male and female, and the total sports they were selected to compete in.

External links
 Commonwealth Games Federation
 Australian Commonwealth Games Association
 Gold Coast Commonwealth Games 2018

Notes

References
 Official results by country

 
Nations at the Commonwealth Games